(More) So Much More is a live EP released by Brett Dennen following the release of his second studio album So Much More. It includes several prominent songs from the previous album as well as a cover version of a Bob Marley song.

Track listing

References

Brett Dennen live albums
2007 live albums
Downtown Records live albums
2007 EPs
Brett Dennen EPs
Downtown Records EPs
Dualtone Records EPs